"Kirpal Singh" or "Kripal Singh" may refer to:

Sant Kirpal Singh Ji Maharaj, Indian spiritual teacher.
Kirpal Singh (politician), Indian member of the Lok Sabha.
Kirpal Singh (Indian Navy officer)
Kirpal Singh (spy), Indian Army intelligence officer who discovered the planned Ghadar Mutiny.
Kirpal Singh Chugh, Indian nephrologist.
Kirpal Singh Narang, Indian educator.
Kripal Singh Shekhawat, Indian ceramic artist.
A. G. Kripal Singh, Indian cricketer.
Arjan Kripal Singh, Indian cricketer.
Ram Kripal Singh, Indian politician.

See also 
Karpal Singh, Malaysian politician and lawyer.
Kripal